The Jewish War Veterans of the United States of America (also referred to as the Jewish War Veterans of the U.S.A., the Jewish War Veterans, or JWV) is an American Jewish veterans' organization created in 1896 by American Civil War veterans to raise awareness of contributions made by Jewish servicemembers. It has an estimated 15,000 members, ranging from World War II to current conflicts and active duty personnel. It is the oldest active national veterans' service organization in America.

History and purpose
Jewish War Veterans of the United States of America, Incorporated was established in 1896. The group holds a Congressional charter under Title 36 of the United States Code.

Organization

The JWV is organized into, in descending order of rank, a National Commander, a National Executive Committee, departments, district or county councils, and posts. There are also subsidiary organizations, including the Ladies Auxiliary, posts or other echelons created outside the United States, and any other subsidiary organizations established by a two-thirds vote of the National Executive Committee.

The National Convention is the annual assembly of the JWV, in which "supreme power" is vested. The National Convention usually takes place over a week in a major U.S. city determined by the National Executive Committee. The 124th Annual National Convention in 2019, for example, was held August 18–23 in Richmond, Virginia. Membership at National Conventions is restricted to voting members of the National Executive Committee who shall vote at the same time with their posts and delegates. Each post may send up to one delegate and one alternate for each ten members.

Membership
Membership eligibility is established in the JWV's National Constitution, which lists the categories of membership as active, associate, honorary, in-service, posthumous, life, and distinguished life , and provides that "No person who promotes, or is a member of any organization or group which believes in, or advocates, bigotry or the overthrow of the United States government by force of arms or subversion" shall be eligible for membership.

Activities
The Jewish War Veterans divides its activities into four areas: Patriotic, Jewish, Service, and Affinity.

Patriotic
The Jewish War Veterans engage in advocacy to preserve religious freedom and separation of church and state as it relates to the U.S. military. Among other activities, the group has criticized Evangelical proselytizing at the United States Air Force Academy and has criticized the presence of crosses on war memorials and military bases. The Jewish War Veterans filed lawsuits seeking the removal of the Mount Soledad cross as well as a large cross at Camp H. M. Smith, and supported a federal court decision to remove a cross on federal lands at an armed forces memorial at Mojave National Preserve.

The JWV also has programs supporting the Boy Scouts and Girl Scouts.

Each year the JWV holds a memorial service at Arlington National Cemetery commemorating Orde Wingate, a major general in the British Army and Zionist. The JWV also holds Memorial Day and Veterans Day ceremonies, as well as Vietnam Veterans Memorial and Korean War Veterans Memorial programs, as well as programs for Vietnam veterans.

The JWV also actively supports women in the military.

At the Annual National Convention, the members always pass JWV's resolution which act as JWV's legislative priorities for the coming year. The 2018 Convention was held in Tampa, FL. The 2019 Convention will be held in Richmond, VA.

Jewish
The JWV manages the National Museum of American Jewish Military History (NMAJMH) in Washington, D.C., close to its headquarters. Annually, JWV and NMAJMH join Sixth & I Historic Synagogue to remember our Fallen Heroes in Iraq and Afghanistan on the Friday before Memorial Day.

The organization sponsors, in cooperation with the Department of Defense, a Days of Remembrance of the Victims of the Holocaust observance on military installations during the week coinciding with Yom HaShoah.

The JWV administers a JWV National Reward Fund, which offers rewards for information leading to the arrest and conviction of those who have perpetrated antisemitic and other hate crimes and presents about 30 engraved kiddush cups for graduates of Federal Military Colleges.

Service
Helping veterans access VA Benefits. National Service Officers (NSO) Program is a nationwide network of our members who are certified to help veterans navigate the claims process.

JWV gives different awards to its members for excellence and service, including awards to different departments, councils, or posts, as well as any echelon or to individuals.

The group runs a "Support Our Soldiers" (SOS), which sends care packages of toiletries and kosher food, and Jewish holiday items to Jewish soldiers serving overseas in Iraq, Afghanistan, or elsewhere.

The JWV also runs a disaster relief fundraising and volunteer program and a National Stamp Distribution Program for "hospitalized veterans."

JWV members also volunteer at VA hospitals and as National Service Officers, which help veterans, regardless of religion, get the benefits they deserve and navigate the complex Department of Veterans Affairs policies.

To connect with younger generations, JWV also runs a Boy Scout and Girl Scout Program, a JROTC program, and the JWV Foundation runs the National Youth Achievement Program which gives grants to high school seniors entering college who are descendants of JWV members. The Foundation also hosts the National Achievement Award Program, which is an essay contest for active duty personnel and veterans looking to continue their education.

Affinity
The JWV offers group insurance plans for its members, as well as discount and promotion plans in cooperation with businesses including USAA.

See also
List of Jewish Americans in the military
Military history of Jewish Americans

References

External links

Jewish War Veterans of the United States of America Official website
Jewish War Veterans of the USA Foundation Official website
Guide to the Jewish War Veterans of the United States of America Collection at the American Jewish Historical Society, New York.

American veterans' organizations
Organizations established in 1896
Jewish organizations based in the United States
Jewish-American military history
Patriotic and national organizations chartered by the United States Congress
Organizations based in Washington, D.C.